Biate may refer to:

 Biate people, an ethnic group of Northeast India
 Biate language, a Sino-Tibetan language of India
 Biate (town), a town in Mizoram, India

See also 
 Beate

Language and nationality disambiguation pages